Shriniwasrao Parshuram  (1687 – 1746 CE), popularly known as Shripatrao Pratinidhi or Shripatrao Pant Pratinidhi , was a General of the Maratha Empire. He served as Pratinidhi (Chief Delegate) during Shahu I's reign.
After the death of his father Parshuram Pant Pratinidhi in 1718, Shripat Rao won the favour of Shahu by his brilliant efforts as a soldier fighting many battles in the defence of the Maratha Empire. In 1718, he was appointed as the Pant Pratinidhi of Maratha Empire.

Shripatrao was not only a very able administrator and organizer, but a great statesman too. His work to consolidate the Maratha Raj has been praised by most of its historians. Shahu Maharaj depended upon the advice of Shripatrao. If owing to some unavoidable reasons Rao didn't present at the court at the usual hour the king would go to his house and inquire about him. Thus Shripatrao, unlike his father had no problem of loyalty to Chhatrapati

Shripatrao was asked by peshwas to establish his headquarters at Poona. Rao consistently refused to do so. He wanted to be at the side of King of the Maratha Empire.

In 1719, on the orders of Chhatrapati Shahu Maharaj, he colonized Sangam Mahuli. There he and his family built various temples.

Early life
Shripatrao, was born in 1687 in the Deshastha Brahmin family of the Pant Pratinidhi, when Parshuram Trimbak was twenty- seven years old. He must have been deeply influenced by his father. He had lived a life of turmoil as well as of glory, and benefited from it. Shahu Maharaj had great respect and regard for Parshuram Pant Pratinidhi.

Campaigns

Campaign against Khatav
Krishnaji Khatavkar had received the pargana of Khatav in 1689 A.D from the Mughal Emperor, Aurangazeb. He refused to accede to the Shahu's authority and had become overbearing. Shripatrao marched towards Khatav and defeated him in battle. Submitting to Shahu's authority was appreciated by Shahu, who released Shripatrao's father.

Karnataka expeditions
In between 1724 and 1727, the Marathas led two expeditions into the Karnataka, one led jointly by Shripatrao Pratinidhi, Peshwa Bajirao I and the Sarlashkar, and the other by Peshwa and Senapati.

The first Karnatak expedition, which lasted for two years, from November 1724 and May 1726, led by Fateh Singh Bhonsale, accompanied by both Shripatrao Pratinidhi and Bajirao I, proved to be futile. The Nizam gave lukewarm support to Marathas. However he regarded the south as his sphere of influence and did not want Marathas to interfere with it. He therefore gave secret instructions to officers to thwart the plans of Marathas in Karnatak. The Maratha leaders who led this campaign could not shed their differences. The Marathas could not realize their objective in this campaign.

The second Karnatak expedition was led by Bajirao him in October 1727. The Pratinidhi who was secretly negotiating with the Nizam, who was rewarded with a personal jagir i Varhad by Nizam. Bajirao therefore did not associate with Pratinidhi with this expedition. He besieged the fort of Serinaapatnam and succeeded in levying chauth and Sardeshmukhi from the rulers of Mysore and Arcot.

Death
After the death of Shripatrao Pratinidhi in 1746 Shahu Maharaj made his younger brother, Jagjivan Parshuram the next Pratinidhi. Jagjivan parashuram was the youngest son of Parashuram Trimbak Pant. He was born in 1691 and became Pratinidhi at the age of fifty-five.

See also
 Pant Pratinidhi family

References

Bibliography
 
 
 
 
 

People of the Maratha Empire
1687 births
1746 deaths
People from Satara district